Comadre Florzinha is the debut album of the Brazilian band Comadre Florzinha. Released in 1999, the album counts on the participation of some famous artists from Brazil and abroad, such as Thomas Rorher (from Switzerland), Siba (from Pernambuco, Brazil) and Renata Rosa (from São Paulo, Brazil).

Track listing

Personnel
Alessandra Leão: vocals, percussion
Isaar de França: vocals, percussion
Karina Buhr: vocals, percussion
Maria Helena: vocals, percussion
Renata Mattar: vocals, accordion, saxophone
Telma César: vocals, percussion

Special guests:
Thomas Rorher: rebec (in "Sapopemba")
Siba: rebec (in "O trem - Cobra verde")
Renata Rosa: vocals (in "Tamarineira")

References

1999 albums
Comadre Florzinha albums